Andrew Hargreaves (born 13 February 1951) is Visiting Professor at the University of Ottawa and Research Professor at Boston College.

Hargreaves grew up in the small Lancashire textile and engineering town of Accrington in England, home to football club Accrington Stanley. In 2002, he laid the foundation stone for the new building at his old primary school, Spring Hill Community Primary School, with his former teacher, Mary Hindle. The youngest of three brothers, he was the first in his extended family history to enter higher education, studying sociology at Sheffield University.

Hargreaves completed his PhD in Sociology at the University of Leeds in England, and lectured in a number of English universities, including Oxford, until in 1987 he moved to the Ontario Institute for Studies in Education in Canada, where he co-founded and directed the International Center for Educational Change. 

Hargreaves has published more than 30 books that have been translated into a dozen languages. He has won eight Outstanding Writing Awards, including, with Michael Fullan, the 2015 Grawemeyer Award.

His most recent books are Well-being in Schools: Three Forces that Will Uplift Your Students in a Volatile World and Five Paths of Student Engagement (both with Dennis Shirley), Moving: A Memoir of Education and Social Mobility, and Collaborative Professionalism: When Teaching Together Means Learning for All with Michael O’Connor.

References

External links 
http://www.andyhargreaves.com

Alumni of the University of Sheffield
Academics of the University of Nottingham
Boston College faculty
People from Accrington
Living people
1951 births
British educational theorists
Alumni of the University of Leeds
British expatriate academics in the United States